Genesis'88 was a party promotion crew who threw some of the first acid house parties also known as raves in the United Kingdom from 1988 to 1992.

It was founded during 1988 during the UK's discovery of acid house. They were an organisation that staged acid house parties in empty industrial warehouses in London and within the M25 motorway area. "Over the course of 1989, promoters such as World Dance, Genesis, Helter Skelter and Energy succeeded in setting acid house nights free of the urban core's constructions, staging ever more elaborate Orbital parties in borrowed and rented fields, the odd warehouse, or some other similarly vacant structure". At that point in time acid house parties were deemed illegal by authorities because most promoters of the period gained entrance into buildings by breaking and entering.

Overview and history
Fuelled by the drug MDMA (Ecstasy), nightclub goers in London were desperate for events that catered to their needs and went on until the early hours of the morning. Genesis’88 found empty warehouses in London and transformed them into state-of-the-art dance arenas that consisted of professional lighting rigs, sound systems and colourful decorations. Unbeknownst to the buildings' owners the Genesis promoters would wear their best business suits and convince police riot squads that the warehouses were acquired through legitimate channels.

Matthew Collin writes in Altered State: The Story of Ecstasy Culture and Acid House: "From their first party in October 1988 onwards, Genesis developed a prodigious reputation for cracking open huge warehouses and holding illegal raves, week after week, from Aldgate to Hackney, Tottenham to Walthamstow". 

To give themselves more credit they would assume official titles such as George Michael’s personal manager or project manager for a major record company. Genesis enjoyed a succession of events that saw attendances rise from 300 to 15,000 people. Victims of their own success, Genesis were targeted by the UK government and the criminal underworld attracted by media articles of huge profits (£500,000) being made by such promoters. The Genesis organisers were kidnapped and threatened with death if they didn’t comply with the gangsters. They demanded 25% of all profits in return for 24-hour protection. This plight was shared by other promoters who had also encountered the same terror tactics.

This, coupled with the government's label of "Public Enemy No.1", brought about the end of illegal acid house parties. Genesis continued arranging parties until 1992 before deciding to quit staging these events. One of the promoters Wayne Anthony, penned a book called Class of 88 - The True Acid House Experience.

Genesis events

1988

1989

1990

1992

See also
Sunrise / Back to the Future – another promoter
List of electronic music festivals
Breakbeat hardcore
Criminal Justice and Public Order Act 1994
Disc jockey
Electronic music
Free party
Hardcore
House music
Rave
Techno music

References

External links
Wayne Anthony's Acid House '88 Email List

Acid house
Rave
Rave culture in the United Kingdom
Electronic music festivals in the United Kingdom
Electronic music event management companies